Birner is a surname. Notable people with the surname include:

Betty Birner, American linguist
Michal Birner (born 1986), Czech ice hockey player
Stanislav Birner (born 1956), Czech tennis player
Dr. N. Birner, pen name of Austrian writer and journalist Nathan Birnbaum

See also
Berner